

Events 
 January–June 

 March 21 – Henry IV enters his capital of Paris for the first time.
 April 17 – Hyacinth of Poland is canonized.
 May
 Uprising in Banat of Serbs against Ottoman rule ends with the public burning of Saint Sava's bones in Belgrade, Serbia.
 Nine Years' War (Ireland): Hugh O'Neill, 2nd Earl of Tyrone and Hugh Roe O'Donnell form an alliance to try to overthrow English domination.
 June 5 – Willem Barents makes his first voyage to the  Arctic Ocean, in search of the Northeast Passage.
 June 11 – Philip II of Spain recognizes the rights and privileges of the local nobles and chieftains in the Philippines, which paves the way for the stabilization of the rule of the Principalía.
 June 22–23 – Anglo-Spanish War: Action of Faial – In the Azores, an English attempt to capture the large Portuguese carrack Cinco Chagas, reputedly one of the richest ever to set sail from the East Indies, causes it to explode with the loss of all but 13 of the 700 on board, and all the treasure.

 July–December 
 July 1 or July 2 – Anglo-Spanish War: Action of Atacames Bay – English privateer Richard Hawkins in the Dainty is attacked and captured by a Spanish squadron off Esmeraldas, Ecuador.
 July 3 – The Ayutthayan–Cambodian War (1591–1594) concludes when Naresuan, ruler of the Ayutthaya Kingdom, sacks Longvek, capital of Cambodia.
 July 22 – After a two-month siege, the city of Groningen submits to Dutch troops, bringing the whole northern Netherlands under the Dutch Republic.
 August 30 – Diplomats meet at Stirling Castle for the Masque at the baptism of Prince Henry.
 October 9 – The Campaign of Danture, which began on July 5 as part of the Sinhalese–Portuguese War, concludes with a decisive victory by forces of the Kingdom of Kandy over the Portuguese Empire, reversing near-total control of Sri Lanka by Portugal.

 Date unknown 
 St. Paul's College is founded in Macau by Jesuits, being the first western style university in the far east.
 In Amsterdam, the Compagnie van Verre is created, with the goal of breaking the Portuguese monopoly on spice trade.
 Tulip bulbs planted by Carolus Clusius in the Hortus Botanicus Leiden, Holland, first flower.
 The city of Pompeii is rediscovered after its loss following the eruption of Mount Vesuvius.

Births

January–June

 January 1 – Barthélemy Vimont, French missionary (d. 1667)
 January 7 – Vincenzo II Gonzaga, Duke of Mantua, Italian duke and Catholic cardinal (d. 1627)
 January 12 – Gregers Krabbe, Governor-general of Norway (d. 1655)
 January 16 – Maeda Toshitsune, Japanese warlord (d. 1658)
 January 24 – Pierre de Marca, French bishop and historian (d. 1662)
 February 2 – Philip Powell, Welsh martyr (d. 1646)
 February 5 – Biagio Marini, Italian violinist and composer (d. 1663)
 February 16 – Juliana Morell, Spanish-French scholar (d. 1653)
 February 19 – Henry Frederick, Prince of Wales, elder son of King James I & VI and Anne of Denmark (d. 1612)
 February 21 – John Ernest I, Duke of Saxe-Weimar, German duke (d. 1626)
 February 26 – William Wadsworth, American colonial (d. 1675)
 March 25 – Maria Tesselschade Visscher, Dutch poet and engraver (d. 1649)
 April 21 – Bernardino Spada, Italian Catholic cardinal (d. 1661)
 April 29 – Samuel Fairclough, English minister (d. 1677)
 May 1 – John Haynes, governor of Connecticut (d. 1653)
 May 9 – Louis Henry, Prince of Nassau-Dillenburg, military leader in the Thirty Years' War (d. 1662)
 May 15 – Sophie of Solms-Laubach, wife of Joachim Ernst, Margrave of Brandenburg-Ansbach (d. 1651)
 May 29 – Gottfried Heinrich Graf zu Pappenheim, field marshal of the Holy Roman Empire in the Thirty Years' War (d. 1632)
 June 3 – César, Duke of Vendôme, French nobleman (d. 1665)
 June 11 – Thomas Cromwell, 1st Earl of Ardglass, English nobleman (d. 1653)
 June 23 – Thomas Tyrrell, English judge and politician (d. 1672)
 June – Nicolas Poussin, French painter (d. 1665)

July–December

 July 6 – Frederick V, Margrave of Baden-Durlach (1622–1659) (d. 1659)
 July 10 – Bartolomeo Gennari, Italian painter (d. 1661)
 July 14 – Beat Albrecht von Ramstein, German Catholic bishop (d. 1651)
 August 4 – Aleksander Ludwik Radziwiłł, Polish noble (d. 1654)
 August 5 – Stefano Durazzo, Italian cardinal (d. 1667)
 August 16 – Queen Inyeol, Korean royal consort (d. 1636)
 September 13 – Francesco Manelli, Italian composer (d. 1667)
 September 30 – Antoine Girard de Saint-Amant, French poet (d. 1661)
 October 4 – Johan Schatter, Dutch Golden Age member of the Haarlem schutterij  (d. 1673)
 October 27 – Johann Rudolf Wettstein, Swiss diplomat (d. 1666)
 November 15 – Jean Puget de la Serre, French author and dramatist (d. 1665)
 November 24 – Henry Grey, 10th Earl of Kent (d. 1651)
 November 26 – James Ware, Irish genealogist (d. 1666)
 November 30 – John Cosin, English churchman (d. 1672)
 December 7 – Frederik Coning, Dutch Golden Age member of the Haarlem schutterij (d. 1636)
 December 8 – Pierre Petit, French astronomer, military engineer, and physicist (d. 1677)
 December 9 – King Gustavus Adolphus of Sweden, Swedish king and general (d. 1632)
 December 21 – Robert Sutton, 1st Baron Lexinton, English politician (d. 1668)
 December 24 – Otto, Landgrave of Hesse-Kassel, Prince of Hesse-Kassel, Administrator of Hersfeld Abbey (d. 1617)
 December 27 – Ove Gjedde, Danish admiral, member of the interim government after the death of Christian IV (d. 1660)

Date unknown
 John Bramhall, English Anglican clergyman and controversialist (d. 1663)
 Peter Oliver, English miniaturist (d. 1648)
 Tomasz Zamoyski, Polish nobleman (d. 1638)

Probable
 Tarquinio Merula, Italian composer (d. 1665)

Deaths 

 February – Barnabe Googe, English poet (b. 1540)
 February 2 – Giovanni Pierluigi da Palestrina, Italian composer (b. 1525)
 February 8 – Countess Palatine Elisabeth of Simmern-Sponheim, Duchess of Saxony (b. 1540)
 April 16 – Ferdinando Stanley, 5th Earl of Derby (b. 1559), second in line to the throne of England
 April 29 – Thomas Cooper, English bishop, lexicographer, and writer (b. c. 1517)
 May 2 – Edward Atslowe, English physician
 May 15 – Charlotte de La Marck, French duchess (b. 1574)
 May 30 – Bálint Balassi, Hungarian writer and noble (b. 1554)
 May 31 
 Tintoretto, Italian painter (b. 1518)
 Francesco Panigarola, Italian bishop (b. 1548)
 June 3 – John Aylmer, English divine (b. 1521)
 June 7 – Rodrigo Lopez, Queen Elizabeth's physician (executed for treason) (b. 1525)
 June 14 – Orlande de Lassus, Flemish composer (b. 1532) 
 June 29 – Niels Kaas, Danish chancellor (b. 1535)
 July – Girolamo Mei, Italian historian and humanist (b. 1519)
 July 10 – Paolo Bellasio, Italian composer and organist (b. 1554)
 August 5 – Archduchess Eleanor of Austria (b. 1534)
 October 8 – Ishikawa Goemon, Japanese ninja and thief (b. 1558)
 October 16 – William Allen, English cardinal (b. 1532)
 November 15 – Sir Martin Frobisher,  British explorer (b. 1535)
 November 20 – Gaspar de Quiroga y Vela, General Inquisitor of Spain (b. 1512)
 November 29 – Alonso de Ercilla y Zúñiga, Basque soldier and poet (b. 1533)
 December 2 – Gerardus Mercator, Flemish-German cartographer (b. 1512)
 December 16 – Allison Balfour, alleged Scottish witch 
 date unknown 
 John Johnson, English lutenist and composer (b. c. 1545)
 Thomas Kyd, author of The Spanish Tragedy (b. 1558)

References